Lærke is a Danish feminine first name meaning "lark." It was ranked as the fourth most popular name for girls born in Denmark in 2009, rising from 10th place in 2008. 

Lærke was first invented as a name by poet Sigfred Pedersen who named his firstborn Lærke in 1946 in Denmark. The name has been in use since that time in Denmark. Lærke Winther Andersen is a Danish actress, while Lærke Kaiser is a fictional character in the 2008 Danish television drama Sommer. 

The English feminine name Lark has been in rare usage in the United States and other English-speaking countries since at least the early 1970s, when it was used for the adopted daughter of actress Mia Farrow, but has never been ranked among the 1,000 most popular names for girls born in the United States.

Notes

Danish feminine given names
Given names derived from birds